Grimlaicus or Grimlaic was a cleric who lived in ninth- or tenth-century Francia, probably around Metz.
He is known only for the book he wrote on how to lead a solitary life within a monastic community, the Regula Solitariorum. This was the first known rule written for hermits in the Latin West, drawing heavily on the Rule of St Benedict. The Regula begins with a prologue, followed by 69 sections, or chapters. Grimlaicus dedicated the compilation to his namesake, a priest. The latter, Mabillon conjectures, lived at the papal court during the pontificate of Formosus.

References

Further reading
 Andrew Thornton, Grimlaicus: Rule for Solitaries (Trappist, Ky., 2011), 
 Andrew Thornton, 'Rule Within Rule, Cell Within Cloister: Grimlaicus's Regula Solitariorum', in Cate Gunn and Herbert McAvoy (eds.) Medieval Anchorites in their communities (Woodbridge, 2017), 68-83
 Charles West, 'Group formation in the Long Tenth Century', in Christine Kleinjung and Stefan Albrecht (eds.), Das lange 10. Jahrhundert – Struktureller Wandel zwischen Zentralisierung und Fragmentierung, äußerem Druck und innerer Krise (Mainz, 2015), pp. 49–59

External link
"Grimlaicus' Rule for Solitaries"

Frankish Christian monks
10th-century Lotharingian people
Hermits